Bad Langensalza (until 1956: Langensalza) is a spa town of 17,500 inhabitants in the Unstrut-Hainich district, Thuringia, central Germany.

Geography

Location 
Bad Langensalza is located in the Thuringian Basin, the fertile lowlands along the Unstrut river. Bad Langensalza lies in an unwooded, intensively farmed and largely flat landscape that rises to the west to the Hainich, to the north to the Heilinger Höhen (Heilinger Heights) and to the southeast to the Fahner Höhen (Fahner Heights).

The town itself is divided into the relatively large old town centre, which is bounded by the historical town wall, and several areas of urban expansion dating from 1850 onwards. Initially, the town expanded southwards and south-eastwards towards the railway station. This is also where the first industrial areas were built. This was followed by expansion to the southwest, where the village of Ufhoven is located, which has since been incorporated into the core town. Since 1950, Bad Langensalza has expanded mainly to the north, where several residential and commercial areas have been built. Municipal reforms since the early 1990s have greatly enlarged the administrative urban area, which now stretches from the forests of the Hainich National Park to the eastern side of the Unstrut river.

Neighbouring towns 
Neighbouring municipalities are (clockwise, starting in the west): Schönstedt, Unstrut-Hainich, Nottertal-Heilinger Höhen, Kirchheilingen, Sundhausen, Tottleben, Urleben and Großvargula in the Unstrut-Hainich district, Tonna and Nessetal in the Gotha district and Hörselberg-Hainich in the Wartburg district.

Administrative division 
Bad Langensalza is divided into a total of 15 quarters (including the core town):

History

The town was first mentioned in historical records ca. 932, as a village named "Salzaha". The town's name was changed to Langensalza ca. 1578, and "Bad" ("Spa") added to the name in 1956.

In 1075, Langensalza was the site of a battle, in which Emperor Henry IV won over the rebelling Saxons and Thuringians.

The town was plundered and damaged by fires during the Thirty Years' War (c. 1632). Fires again destroyed large parts of the town in 1711, including complete destruction of the town hall, which was rebuilt between 1742 and 1752.

War again affected the town between 1756 and 1763, during the Seven Years' War; it was the scene of a battle in February 1761. In 1815 Langensalza became part of the Prussian Province of Saxony.

In 1866 it was again the site of a battle between Prussia and Hanover during the Austro-Prussian War. This Battle of Langensalza is famous for being the last time intra-German forces have met in combat.

On April 5, 1945, Langensalza was occupied by American troops and handed over to the Red Army in early July. It became part of the Soviet (Russian) occupation zone and, from 1949 to 1990, was part of the German Democratic Republic.

Main sights
Langensalza is a popular tourist destination, with a well-preserved medieval old town, a number of themed public gardens and a thermal spa bath. In 2011 it won the title "Most blooming town in Europe" as part of the Europe-wide horticultural competition Entente Florale.

Sulphur springs were discovered in 1811 and opened to the public as a curative bath in 1812. A new version of the public sulphur bath was opened in 1928. Salt and mineral water springs were discovered in 1996, which prompted the opening of many new curative facilities. Today a modern thermal bath attracts many visitors.

Bad Langensalza contains a Botanical Garden, along with a Rose Garden, a Magnolia Garden and an Arboretum. It is one of the few European towns with an authentic Japanese Garden. Bad Langensalza is also close to the Hainich National Park, Germany's oldest deciduous forest.

Every August, the town hosts a Middle Ages Festival (Mittelalterstadtfest) where townsfolk don traditional dress from the middle ages and visitors can experience medieval crafts, handwork, martial arts, food and music.

The town is on the German Timber-Frame Road (Fachwerkstraße) and is notable for the number of well-preserved medieval half-timbered (Fachwerk) houses.

Travertine stone has been mined in the town since medieval times, and is still carved there today. It forms the distinctive white stonework of the old town. Travertine from Langensalza was used in the building of the Brandenburg Gate and in one of the most famous works of modern architecture, the Barcelona Pavilion.

Cultural

The then Augustinian monk Martin Luther visited Langensalza's (still preserved) Augustinian Cloister in 1516 in his role as District Vicar. As a result, the town is now on the Luther Trail. The poet Friedrich Gottlieb Klopstock lived in Langensalza between 1748 and 1750, where he composed some of his most famous odes. His sumptuous house is still standing in the Salzstraße. The poet Novalis lived for a time in Langensalza in 1796 whilst studying chemistry under Johann Christian Wiegleb at his house in the Markstraße. Christoph Wilhelm Hufeland, the most eminent German physician of the 19th Century, was born in Langensalza. He is buried in the famous Dorotheenstadt Cemetery in Berlin.

Twin towns – sister cities

Bad Langensalza is twinned with:
 Oostkamp, Belgium
 Bad Nauheim, Germany

Notable people 

Hermann von Salza (around 1170–1239), 4th Master of the Teutonic Order
Georg Neumark (1621–1681), composer and poet
Johann Christian Wiegleb (1732–1800), naturalist and pharmacist
Christoph Wilhelm Hufeland (1762–1836), physician, founder of macrobiotics
Hermann Bonitz (1814–1888), scholar and educator
Ulrich Kleemann (1892–1963), general of tank troops in World War II
Rudolf Batz (1903–1961), Sturmbannführer, leader of Einsatzkommando 2, responsible for the mass murder of Jews in the Baltics
Dieter Fromm (born 1948), middle-distance runner
Uwe Barth (born 1964), politician (FDP)
Radost Bokel (born 1975), actress
Claudia Schramm (born 1975), bobsledder
Enrico Kühn (born 1977), bobsledder
Marco Engelhardt (born 1980), footballer
Silvio Heinevetter (born 1984), handball player
Matthias Rahn (born 1990), footballer

References

External links
 
 

 Video showcasing the town

Gallery

 
Unstrut-Hainich-Kreis
Spa towns in Germany